MHMS may refer to:
 Ministry of Health and Medical Services (Kiribati)
 Ministry of Health and Medical Services (Solomon Islands)
 Schools
 Murray Hill Middle School - Howard County Public School System
 Mary Hoge Middle School - Weslaco Independent School District
 Mansur Habibullah Memorial School